is a Japanese singer, who sings mainly with R&B influences. Her major label debut album, Timeless, was released in January 2006.

Biography
Yoshika spent much of her youth in Canada and the United States, studying at a high school in Modesto, California and influenced by American R&B.

Influenced by Common (rapper), India.Arie, and Jill Scott, she returned to Japan at the age of 18. She recorded a song titled "Jolie" for a TV commercial which was picked up for release, leading to her meeting Japanese Hip-Hop producers M-Flo. For her major label debut "Timeless" on Atlantic Records she intended to bring a strong sense of American R&B to a new Japanese scene led by Double (singer), Heartsdales, and Bennie K.

Shortly after the release, on 24 May 2006, Yoshika announced on her official website that she was pregnant and that she would halt her career to get married. She returned on 24 December 2008 with the release of a new album, World, on a new label, Grand Trax. Her latest original album, Redwood Tree was released on 13 January 2010, with a live album, "I Sing -Live Best-" following two months later.

Discography

Original albums
 Straight Ahead (2003)
 Timeless (2006)
 World (2008)
 Redwood Tree (2010)
 YOSHIKA (2015)
 About a Beautiful Mistake (2018)
 In Such Darkness (2019)

Other albums
 X'mas Surprise! (2008) (digital EP)
 I Sing -Live Best- (2010)
 Strongly in Life (2010) (digital EP)

Singles
"Jolie" (2003)
"Let Go" (M-Flo loves Yoshika) (2004)
"Call Me" (2005)
"Just Us" (2005)
"Touch" (2008) (digital single)

DVD / VHS
[2006.02.22] M-Flo – M-Flo Tour 2005 Beat Space Nine at Nippon Budokan ("Taste Your Stuff," "Loop in My Heart," "tO yOUR bEAT," "Let Go")

Collaborations
[2003.03.26] CM Style – Sony CM Tracks – "Jolie"
[2004.11.17] m-flo – "Let Go"
[2005.02.23] m-flo – "Dopamine" ("tO yOUR bEAT")
[2005.07.13] m-flo – "Loop in My Heart / Hey!" ("Loop in My Heart"; "Let Go" (Reggae Disco Rockers Remix))
[2005.08.24] m-flo – "Beat Space Nine" ("Loop in My Heart"; "tO yOUR bEAT"; "Let Go")
[2005.11.02] m-flo – "Dope Space Nine" ("Loop in My Heart" (Home Grown Remix); "tO yOUR bEAT" (Gagle re-treatment remix); "Let Go" (Reggae Disco Rockers Remix))
[2006.02.22] Tomita Lab – "Shiplaunching" (Shiawase no Blue [しあわせのBlue])
[2006.05.24] Tommy Snyder – Kiraware Matsuko no Utatachi (Here, Always)

References

External links
Official website
Official Warner Music Profile
Oricon Profile (Japanese)

Living people
1983 births
People from Yokohama
Musicians from Kanagawa Prefecture
21st-century Japanese singers
21st-century Japanese women singers